The 2019-20 Moroccan Women's Throne Cup is the women version of Moroccan Throne Cup, the main knockout football tournament in Morocco

Second round 
The draw for the Second Round was held on 15 December 2020.

Third round 
The draw for the Third Round was held on 28 December 2020. Club Oasis Errachidia, Nahdat M'diq and Association Tamasna received a bye for the next round.

Fourth round 
The draw for the Fourth Round was held on 21 January 2021. In this round eight teams have to compete for a spot in the quarterfinals while the four others will receive a bye to the quarterfinals. Those four teams were Najah Azrou, Atlas 05 Fkih Ben Salah, Chabab Mohammedia and Club Municipal de Laayoune.

Final Phase bracket

Quarter-finals 
The draw was held on the same time as the one for the fourth round. The teams that received a bye in the previous round will have to play on the opposite team fields.

Semi-finals

See also
2020-21 Moroccan Women's Championship Division One
2020-21 Moroccan Women's Championship Division Two
2020–21 Botola

References

Women's football in Morocco